Francis Rawdon Moira Crozier  (17 October 1796 – disappeared 26 April 1848) was an Irish officer of the Royal Navy and polar explorer who participated in six expeditions to the Arctic and Antarctic. In May 1845, he was second-in-command to Sir John Franklin and captain of  during the Franklin expedition to discover the Northwest Passage, which ended with the loss of all 129 crewmen in mysterious circumstances.

Early life 
Francis Crozier was born in Banbridge, County Down, in Ulster, the northern province in Ireland. He was the eleventh of thirteen children, and the fifth son of solicitor George Crozier, who named him after his friend Francis Rawdon-Hastings, 2nd Earl of Moira. Crozier attended school locally in Banbridge, with his brothers William and Thomas, and lived with his family in Avonmore House which his father had built in 1792, in the centre of Banbridge.

Naval service 
At the age of 13, Crozier volunteered for the Royal Navy and joined HMS Hamadryad in June 1810. In 1817, he received his certificate as mate; in 1818, he served on  during a trip to the Cape of Good Hope.

Crozier joined Captain William Parry's second Arctic expedition to traverse the Northwest Passage in 1821. He served as midshipman on Parry's , which was accompanied by Captain Lyon's . He returned to the North with Parry a second time in 1824, this time on Hecla. The journey resulted in the sinking of Fury off Somerset Island. Crozier was promoted to lieutenant in 1826, and a year later, he once more joined Parry in his attempt to reach the North Pole; ultimately a futile endeavour.

During his voyages, Crozier became a close friend and confidant of the explorer James Clark Ross. He was elected to become a Fellow of the Royal Astronomical Society in 1827, after conducting valuable astronomical and magnetic studies on his three expeditions with Parry.

He was appointed to the frigate  in 1831, and served off the coast of Portugal during the Liberal Wars, the country's civil war. Crozier joined Clark Ross as second-in-command of HMS Cove in 1835, to assist in the search for 12 lost British whaling ships in the Arctic. Crozier was appointed to the rank of commander in 1837.

Ross expedition 

Crozier commanded Terror, and was appointed to the rank of captain in 1841. Erebus and Terror returned in 1843, having made the most significant penetration of the Antarctic pack ice and discovered large parts of the continent—including the Ross Sea and Ross Island, Mount Erebus and the Ross Ice Shelf.

Crozier was elected a Fellow of the Royal Society in 1843, in recognition of his outstanding work on magnetism.

Franklin expedition 

Crozier was considered to lead this expedition, but his Irish ancestry and humble birth counted against him. The privilege of selecting subordinating officers, almost always given to the second-in-command, was given to James Fitzjames. After Franklin's death in June 1847, he took command of the expedition, and his fate and those of the other expedition members remained a mystery until 1859, when a note written by Crozier and James Fitzjames, captain of the Erebus, was discovered on King William Island during an expedition led by Francis McClintock. Dated 25 April 1848, the note indicated that the ships—stuck in thick pack ice—had been abandoned. Nine officers, including Sir John Franklin, and 15 crewmen had died. Also stated was their intention, on 26 April, to set out on foot for Back's Great Fish River on the Canadian mainland.

McClintock and later searchers found relics, graves, and human remains of the Franklin crew on Beechey Island, King William Island, and the northern coast of the Canadian mainland.

Ships' location 
In 2014, the Victoria Strait Expedition found two items on Hat Island, in the Queen Maud Gulf, near King William Island; part of a boat-launching davit bearing the stamps of two Royal Navy broad arrows, and a wooden object, possibly a plug for a deck hawse, the iron pipe through which the ship's chain cable would descend into the chain locker below. The expedition located one of Franklin's two ships, preserved in reasonably good condition. The wreck lies at the bottom of the eastern portion of Queen Maud Gulf, west of O'Reilly Island and has been confirmed to be that of the Erebus. In 2016, a well-preserved ship matching Terrors description was located in Terror Bay, off the southern coast of King William Island. The exploration of the wrecks continues.

Legacy 

In January 2008, Crozier's home town of Banbridge hosted a memorial event, which included a service of remembrance and thanksgiving at the Church of the Holy Trinity, which was attended by more than a hundred descendants of Crozier and other officers of Franklin's lost expedition and those who searched for it, along with the chairman of Banbridge Council, and several Arctic historians, including Michael Smith and Russell Potter.

A memorial to Sir John Franklin and his men was erected by order of Parliament in 1858, in the Painted Hall of London's Greenwich Hospital. It was moved to Greenwich Royal Naval College's chapel in 1937, and was re-erected in the entrance of the former college in late 2009. At the service of thanksgiving on 29 October 2009, polar travellers and descendants of the expedition's crew celebrated their contributions.

Namesake 
Geographical features named after Crozier include:
 Cape Crozier on the eastern side of Ross Island, Antarctica
 Cape Crozier on the western flank of King William Island, in the Canadian Arctic
 Cape Crozier at the western entrance of the Bay of Mercy on Banks Island, in the Canadian Arctic
 Crozier Strait which lies between Cornwallis and Bathurst Islands, in the Canadian Arctic
 Crozier River, near Fury and Hecla Strait in the Canadian Arctic
 Crozier Point on Spitsbergen, in the Arctic north of Norway
 Crozier Channel, to the north of Banks Island in the Canadian Arctic
 Crozier Island in the Kennedy Channel, between Greenland and Ellesmere Island
 The lunar crater Crozier, located at 13.5° S, 50.8° E on the Moon's near side
 Crozier Hill, Victor Harbor, South Australia
 Crozier Place, a street in Stanley, Falkland Islands
 The hydrographic survey vessel HMS Crozier was named after him in 1919.
 Francis Street in the suburb of Keilor Park in Melbourne, Australia

Popular culture 
Francis Crozier appears as a character and the primary narrator of the 2007 best-selling novel, The Terror by Dan Simmons, a fictionalized account of Franklin's lost expedition, as well as the 2018 television adaptation, where Crozier is portrayed by Jared Harris. Both the novel and the television adaptation depict Crozier as the sole survivor of the expedition and joining an Inuit tribe instead of seeking to return to his homeland.

References

External links 

 
 

19th-century explorers
19th-century Royal Navy personnel
1796 births
1840s deaths
1840s missing person cases
Date of death unknown
Fellows of the Royal Society
Irish Antarctic explorers
Irish Arctic explorers
Irish people of Norman descent
Lost explorers
People from Banbridge
Recipients of the Polar Medal
Royal Navy officers
Franklin's lost expedition